Hazel Perfect (circa 1927 – 8 July 2015) was a British mathematician specialising in combinatorics.

Contributions
Perfect was known for inventing gammoids, for her work with Leon Mirsky on doubly stochastic matrices, for her three books Topics in Geometry, Topics in Algebra, and Independence Theory in Combinatorics, and for her work as a translator (from an earlier German translation) of Pavel Alexandrov's book An Introduction to the Theory of Groups (Hafner, 1959).

The Perfect–Mirsky conjecture, named after Perfect and Leon Mirsky, concerns the region of the complex plane formed by the eigenvalues of doubly stochastic matrices.

Education and career
Perfect earned a master's degree through Westfield College (a constituent college for women in the University of London) in 1949, with a thesis on The Reduction of Matrices to Canonical Form.
In the 1950s, Perfect was a lecturer at University College of Swansea; she collaborated with Gordon Petersen, a visitor to Swansea at that time, on their translation of Alexandrov's book.
She completed her Ph.D. at the University of London in 1969; her dissertation was Studies in Transversal Theory with Particular Reference to Independence Structures and Graphs. She became a reader in mathematics at the University of Sheffield.

Selected publications

Books

Research papers

Translation

References

2015 deaths
British mathematicians
Women mathematicians
Alumni of Westfield College
Academics of Swansea University
Academics of the University of Sheffield
German–English translators
Technical translators
Combinatorialists
Year of birth uncertain